Orion Media was a UK commercial radio group, founded in 2009 after a management buy-in, with backing from Lloyds Development Capital. It was created from the enforced sale of several radio stations in the English Midlands previously owned by Global Radio.

In May 2016, the company was sold to Bauer Media Group.

History

Following Global Radio's acquisition of GCap Media in 2007, it was deemed that Global had an unfair advantage in the West Midlands market as they owned the vast majority of stations.

The OFT wanted to re-install competition in the Midlands area, causing Global to sell some of their stations. In May 2009, LDC and the buy-in team purchased BRMB, Mercia, Wyvern, Beacon in the West Midlands and Heart 106 in the East Midlands from Global Radio for a total price of £37.5 million, beating off competition from several other interested parties   These stations accounted for around three per cent of the total commercial radio audience at the time.

In June 2009, the new group was named Orion Media.

In January 2011, Orion's East Midlands station Heart 106 was rebranded and relaunched as Gem 106, following the end of a franchise agreement with Global Radio allowing the station to use the Heart branding and carry networked programming from London.

In January 2012, Orion Media announced that its four FM stations in the West Midlands region were to be renamed 'Free Radio' - replacing the individual names BRMB, Mercia, Wyvern and Beacon. The rebranding took place at 7pm on Monday 26 March 2012.

On 24 May 2012, Orion Media announced it would relaunch its Gold West Midlands stations on AM frequencies and DAB as Free Radio 80s later in the year. The station, which aired networked programming from London with opt-outs for sports programming, switched to locally produced output playing 1980s music alongside news and information and live football commentaries on Monday 4 September 2012, ending a franchise agreement with Global Radio which allowed the station to carry Gold branding and output.

On 6 May 2016, Orion announced they had been bought by Bauer for an undisclosed fee, reportedly between £40 and £50 million.

Stations owned

References

Radio broadcasting companies of the United Kingdom
Mass media in the West Midlands (region)
Bauer Radio
Global Radio